The Renault 4P, also called the Renault Bengali Junior, was a series of air-cooled 4-cylinder inverted inline aero engines designed and built in France from 1927, which produced from  to .

Design and development
Charles Lindbergh's Atlantic Ocean crossing in 1927 inspired Renault to enter the light aero-engine market to diversify the range of engines they offered. The resulting Renault 4Ps, with  bore and  stroke, delivered  and proved popular, later versions powering several record-breaking light aircraft.

The 4Pei was produced in the USSR, with local equipment and features from the MV-6, as the Voronezh MV-4 (Motor Vozdushniy / Motor Voronezhskiy - air-cooled engine / Voronezh built engine {correct interpretation is unclear}).

In 1946 production of the Renault 4P-01 resumed at the SNECMA factory at Arnage, until 1949, with at least 762 engines manufactured.

Variants
Renault 4Ps
The initial version with  bore and  stroke, delivered 
Renault 4Pa

Renault 4Pb
upright  /  - Caudron Luciole
Renault 4Pbi
Inverted development of the Pb retaining the  bore
Renault 4Pc
Further development of the Ps retaining the  bore
Renault 4Pci
inverted 4Pc
Renault 4Pde

Renault 4Pdi
Inverted, introduced  bore steel cylinder liners, aluminium alloy cylinder heads attached by long studs to the crankcase, Duralumin connecting rods and magnesium alloy crankcase. 110 hp / 150 kg - Hanriot 16, 120 hp / 155 kg - Caudron Phalène
Renault 4Pei
Renault 4Pfi
Renault 4Pgi
Inverted lower rated version, giving  for take-off, using 73-octane fuel.
Renault 4Po

Renault 4Poi
 with fuel injection.
Renault 4P-01
Renault 4P-03
As the 4P-01 but with an inverted flight Zenith carburettor
Renault 4P-05
As for the 4P-03 but with a modified  oil system
Renault 4P-07
As for the 4P-03 but with a modified carburettor
MV-4Licence production of a  Renault 4Pei variant in the USSR at the Voronezh factory. 180+ were built in 1939 before production ceased, due to a shortage of indigenous carburettors.

Applications

Specifications (Renault 4P-01)

See also

References 

 Gérard Hartmann, Les Moteurs d'avion Renault
Wilkinson, Paul H.. Aircraft Engines of the World 1945 3rd edition. Paul H. Wilkinson. 1945. New York.
Wilkinson, Paul H.. Aircraft Engines of the World 1946 revised edition. Sir Isaac Pitman & Sons Ltd.. 1946. London.

1920s aircraft piston engines
4P